Rail Users Ireland (previously Platform 11) is a rail transport pressure group in Ireland whose agenda is centred on the idea that there is an economic case for expanding rail transport in Ireland through better utilisation of existing infrastructure with only justified expansion of existing routes.  Through press releases, lobbying and leafleting the group has promoted a number of rail projects.  The group is a member of the European Passengers' Federation a European level representative body.

History and organisation 
Platform 11 was founded in January 2003 at a public meeting held in Dublin

As well as making the case for expanded commuter services in the Greater Dublin Area, the group has advocated suburban rail for Galway and Limerick if combined with a focused planning environment such as the Cork LUTS (Land Use and Transportation Study). They also advocate bus services connecting to railheads where rail is not feasible. They also support direct rather than connecting services to Clonmel.

Projects 
The group has expressed opinions or lobbied in relation to a number of rail projects in Ireland. 

In relation to the proposed Dublin Metro, while supportive of the concept in principle, Rail Users Ireland expressed concerns that the original plans offered "insufficient interconnections" with other parts of the rail network. 

In the early planning phases of the Luas project, Platform 11 raised doubts about the Railway Procurement Agency's assertion that 40-metre trams were not necessary on the red line to Tallaght. The Railway Procurement Agency have since ordered the 10-metre sections to bring all 30-metre trams to 40-metre length as well as to commence work on the depot at Red Cow to accommodate an enlarged fleet.

In relation to the Western Railway Corridor proposals, Rail Users Ireland took the view that it would only support projects they deemed viable. The Western Rail Corridor had support from other groups and politicians in the Mayo, Galway and Clare areas, and a considerable political profile in the West of Ireland, albeit with no meaningful follow-through such as local council planning. Supporters of the Western Railway Corridor project were angered that Rail Users Ireland opposed the project on cost grounds.

Criticisms 
Rail Users Ireland are very critical of Irish Rail, the RPA (rail procurement agency) and the Irish Government, within the context of service provision, implementation of new projects and interference in the planning and development of rail transport based transport projects.

Rail Users Ireland has changed policy positions dramatically since its formation in 2003 when it supported the Western Rail Corridor, opposed the Interconnector project and attacked Irish Rail for concentrating development resources in the Pale.  It now claims to favour the sections of the Western Railway Corridor from Ennis to Tuam which are about to be rebuilt.

References

External links
 Rail Users Ireland Website
 
Rail transport in the Republic of Ireland
Political advocacy groups in the Republic of Ireland